Jack Morgan Podlesny (born March 16, 2000) is an American football placekicker for the Georgia Bulldogs. Nicknamed "Hot Pod," he was named the SEC Special Teams Player of the Year in 2022.

High school career 
Podlesny attended Glynn Academy in Brunswick, Georgia. In his senior year, Podlesny converted on nine of his ten field goal tries, while making 49 of his 51 point-after-tries. Despite offers from schools such as Georgia Tech, North Carolina, and Michigan, Podlesny walked on at the University of Georgia.

College career 
In 2018, Podlesny would redshirt, and the following year, he would be the backup to Rodrigo Blankenship. In 2020, Podlesny would become Georgia's starting kicker. During the season, Podlesny made 13 field goals out of 16 attempts, while making all of his 38 point-after-tries. As a result, Podlesny was named a semi-finalist for the Lou Groza Award. During the 2021 Peach Bowl, Podlesny hit a career-long 53-yard go-ahead field goal with 0:03 seconds remaining. The kick was the longest field goal in Peach Bowl history and Podlesny was named the game's MVP for his efforts. After the game, Podlesny was awarded a scholarship. In 2021, Podlesny went 22 of 27 on field goal attempts. During the 2022 College Football Playoff National Championship, Podlesny recorded two field goals including a season-high 49-yard field goal in a 33−18 victory. During Podlesny's redshirt senior season, he converted 23 out of 26 field goals, being named the SEC Special Teams Player of the Year and the All-SEC First-Team.

After Georgia won the 2023 College Football Playoff National Championship, Podlesny played in the 2023 Hula Bowl.

Personal life
Podlesny is a Christian. He has said, “At the end of the day, I’m playing to glorify Him and Him only.” He has also said, “No matter a make or miss I can still be an example of Christ in how I live my life and respond.”

References

External links 

 Georgia Bulldogs bio

Living people
Georgia Bulldogs football players
American football placekickers
People from St. Simons, Georgia
Players of American football from Georgia (U.S. state)
Year of birth missing (living people)